The University Club of Milwaukee is a private club in Milwaukee, Wisconsin, located at 924 E. Wells Street.  The club, which was founded by a group of nineteen college alumni, received its charter November 7, 1898. Its first president was August H. Vogel.

History
The club first met in a modest residence at 508 Jackson Street, near what is now a surface parking lot at Clybourn and Jackson Streets.  In 1928, the club moved into its current clubhouse, newly designed by John Russell Pope, at the corner of Wells and Prospect Streets overlooking Lake Michigan.

University Club Tower
In 2007, construction of a namesake luxury condominium tower was completed on a site immediately north of the club.  The 36-floor, 446-feet tall University Club Tower is now the tallest residential building and fourth tallest building in Milwaukee and the state of Wisconsin.  The tower houses a health club facility for residents that doubles as the University Club's own member health club.

See also
 List of American gentlemen's clubs

References

Official Site

External links
University Club of Milwaukee (official website)
Clubhouse images
University Club Tower Official Site

1898 establishments in Wisconsin
Buildings and structures completed in 1928
Buildings and structures in Milwaukee
Clubs and societies in the United States
John Russell Pope buildings
Gentlemen's clubs in the United States